Thembi is the seventh album by free jazz saxophonist Pharoah Sanders, released in 1971.

Overview 
Sanders moved away from the long, intense compositions of his earlier albums and produced an album of shorter tracks. He and other musicians played a large variety of instruments. Sanders played tenor, alto, and soprano saxophone, balaphone, small percussion instruments, and a cow horn.

Sanders's other major collaborator, pianist and composer Lonnie Liston Smith, performs on Thembi (though this would be the last time they recorded together). Also featured are violinist Michael White, bassist Cecil McBee, and percussionists Chief Bey, Majid Shabbaz, and Nat Bettis. "Thembi", "Astral Travelling" and "Morning Prayer" were included on the two-disc anthology, You've Got to Have Freedom, on Soul Brother Records.

Lonnie Liston Smith began experimenting with electric keyboards while recording this album:
On Thembi, that was the first time that I ever touched a Fender Rhodes electric piano. We got to the studio in California — Cecil McBee had to unpack his bass, the drummer had to set up his drums, Pharoah had to unpack all of his horns. Everybody had something to do, but the piano was just sitting there waiting. I saw this instrument sitting in the corner and I asked the engineer, 'What is that?' He said, 'That's a Fender Rhodes electric piano.' I didn't have anything to do, so I started messing with it, checking some of the buttons to see what I could do with different sounds. All of a sudden I started writing a song and everybody ran over and said, 'What is that?' And I said, 'I don't know, I'm just messing around.' Pharoah said, 'Man, we gotta record that. Whatcha gonna call it?' I'd been studying astral projections and it sounded like we were floating through space so I said let's call it 'Astral Traveling.' That's how I got introduced to the electric piano.

Smith's 1973 debut album was titled Astral Traveling, and opens with the tune of the same name.

Reception 

AllMusic gave the album a four-star rating (of a possible five), and reviewer Steve Huey described the album as offering "an intriguingly wide range of relatively concise ideas, making it something of an anomaly in Sanders' prime period.… Some fans may gripe that Thembi isn't conceptually unified or intense enough, but it's rare to have this many different sides of Sanders coexisting in one place, and that's what makes the album such an interesting listen."

In a review for All About Jazz, Chris May called Astral Travelling "a lush, sweeping group workout foursquare in the astral paradigm" and stated that it is "given an exquisite performance" on the album. Regarding "Red, Black & Green", May wrote, "Sanders' overdubbed saxophones are foregrounded practically throughout, played in a style closer to the tumultuous one adopted by Sanders when he was a member of saxophonist John Coltrane's groups... Here, Sanders' sole concession is to play within a marginally more lyrical harmonic framework." May also praised McBee's bass solo "Love", calling it "the sort of track that gives bass solos a good name" and commenting, "McBee turns in a corker, starting conventionally enough, albeit with frequent use of percussive, 'Africanized' string-on-wood effects, before focusing on cleanly articulated high-harmonics."

Track listing
"Astral Travelling" (Lonnie Liston Smith) - 5:48
"Red, Black & Green" (Sanders) - 8:56
"Thembi" (Sanders) - 7:02
"Love" (Cecil McBee) - 5:12
"Morning Prayer" (Sanders, Liston Smith) - 9:11
"Bailophone Dance" (Sanders) - 5:43

Personnel
 Pharoah Sanders – tenor and soprano saxophones, alto flute, koto, brass bells, balaphone, maracas, cow horn, fifes
 Lonnie Liston Smith – piano, electric piano, claves, percussion, ring cymbal, shouts, balaphone
 Michael White – violin, percussion
 Cecil McBee – bass, finger cymbal, percussion
 Roy Haynes – drums
 Clifford Jarvis – drums, maracas, bells, percussion
 Nat Bettis, Chief Bey, Majid Shabazz, Anthony Wiles – African percussion
 James Jordan – ring cymbal

Recording details
Tracks 1–4 were recorded at the Record Plant, Los Angeles, California, on November 25, 1970. Track 4 is an unaccompanied bass solo. Tracks 5–6 were recorded at the Record Plant, New York City, on January 12, 1971. The assistant engineer was Lillian Davis Douma.

References

1971 albums
Albums produced by Bill Szymczyk
Pharoah Sanders albums
Impulse! Records albums